Dhaka University of Engineering & Technology, Gazipur or DUET is a public university in Gazipur, Bangladesh which focuses on the study of engineering and architecture. It is one of the nine PhD granting research universities of Bangladesh.

Most of the existing 13 departments under 4 faculties offer both undergraduate and postgraduate degrees, including PhD programs. Apart from the faculties, there are also 03 institutes that offer postgraduate degrees and emphasize research.

About a total of 3500 students are currently pursuing undergraduate and postgraduate studies. The current per year intake of undergraduate students is around 880, and graduate students in Masters and PhD programs are about 240. The university also has a cell (Institutional Quality Assurance Cell – IQAC) to enhance and ensure quality education and research.

In addition to its own research the university undertakes collaborative research programs with different national and international universities, industries, and organizations. Every year, around 660+ students enroll in undergraduate programs to study engineering and architecture.

In the undergraduate admission test, only about top 5% students can get admitted among 12,000 selected candidates. The number of teachers is about 300+. Only the Diploma in engineering holders can avail themselves of enrolling here for bachelor's degree in Engineering and Architecture.

History
The university was originated in 1980 as the College of Engineering at its temporary campus at Tejgaon, Dhaka under the University of Dhaka offering four years bachelor's degree in Civil, Electrical and Electronic, Mechanical Engineering. After a short time, the College of Engineering was renamed as Dhaka Engineering College (DEC). Then DEC shifted to its present permanent campus Gazipur City in 1983.

DEC was converted into the Bangladesh Institute of Technology (BIT), Dhaka as a degree awarding Institute by the government ordinance in 1986.

In September 2003, BITD became Dhaka University of Engineering & Technology, Gazipur by "Dhaka University of Engineering and Technology, Gazipur Act, 2003" along with three other engineering universities (CUET, KUET, RUET). Under this act, the university became an autonomous statutory organization of the Government of the People's Republic of Bangladesh.

Location

Academic

Faculties and departments
 Faculty of Civil Engineering
 Department of Civil Engineering (CE)
  Department of Architecture (Arch)
 Faculty of  Electrical engineering|Electrical and Electronic Engineering
  Department of Electrical & Electronic Engineering(EEE)
  Department of Computer Science & Engineering(CSE)
  Faculty of Mechanical engineering|Mechanical Engineering
  Department of Mechanical engineering|Mechanical Engineering (ME)
  Department of Textile Engineering (TE)
  Department of Industrial & production engineering|Industrial & Production Engineering(IPE)
  Department Of Chemical engineering|Chemical Engineering
 Department Of Food engineering|Food Engineering
  Department of Materials and Metallurgical Engineering (MME)  
  Faculty of Engineering
   Department of Chemistry
   Department of Mathematics
   Department of Physics
   Department of Humanities & Social Sciences

Enrollment

Undergraduate program 
DUET offers ten undergraduate degrees across its four faculties. Each academic year comprises two semesters, i.e., first and second semester. Students are generally admitted into the first year second semester class. The first semester of first year class is exempted because of the candidates' completion of minimum four-year Diploma in Engineering backgrounds after 10 years of schooling. Degrees offered in the following disciplines:
 Civil engineering
 Electrical & electronic engineering
 Mechanical engineering
 Computer science & engineering
 Textile engineering
 Architecture
 Industrial & production engineering
 Chemical & food engineering
 Materials and metallurgical engineering

Number of seats 
The number of seats for 4-year bachelor's degree in Engineering Programmes and 5-year bachelor's degree of Architecture Programme is given below:

Postgraduate program 
DUET offers 14 Graduate degree across its four faculties. Masters and PhD degrees are offered by the university. M.Sc. Engineering/M. Engineering/PhD/M. Phil degrees are offered in the different area.

Institutes 
There are four institutes which are:
  Institute of Water & Environment Sciences (IWES)
  Information & Communication Technology (IICT)
  Institute of Energy Engineering (IEE)
  Institute of Appropriate Technology (IAT)

Library 

The general library has over 25000 items on all subject relevant to academic programmed.

Library   service include lending, reference, photo-copying and document delivery service. The library has a computerized  information system to provide information about library materials for its members. All library services are available to faculty and students. Besides, the general library systems each academic discipline maintains rental library from which students can borrow text books at a nominal rate for the whole semester. Each department maintains its own affluent and modern rental library which provides sufficient books for the students of the respective discipline.

Student life

Halls of residence 

There are six male and two female dormitories, named:
  FR Khan Hall
  Muhammad Qudrat-E-Khuda Hall
  Shaheed Muktijoddha Hall
  Kazi Nazrul Islam Hall
  Kazi Nazrul Islam Extension Hall
  Marie Curie Hall & Extension
  Shaheed Tajuddin Ahmad Hall

Student organizations 
There are a number of student organizations in the university.
 Bangladesh Chhatra League(DUET Unit)
 Bangladesh Jatiotabadi Chatra Dal (DUET Unit)
 Bangladesh Islami Chhatra Shibir (DUET Unit)
 IEEE - DUET Student Branch
 DUET SPORTS CLUB
 DUET ROBOTICS CLUB (DRC)
 ELC - English Language Club
 DDS- DUET Debating Society
 DUET Carrier & Research CLUB
 DUET Innovation Society (DIS)
 Unity of Textile Students DUET (UTD)
 Srijonee- Cultural & Social Organization

Professional organization 
 Alumni

Sports facilities 
 One main, and one small playground
 Football, Cricket, Badminton facility; yearly inter department and inter hall tournaments.

Convocations 
 Second convocation: 2018
 First convocation:

Journals and research bulletins 
 DUET Journal
 DUET Bulletin

Administration

List of vice-chancellors, DUET 
 2020-2024: Md. Habibur Rahman
 2016-2020: Mohammed Alauddin
 Dr.Habibur Rahman (present)

Directors of Students’ Welfare 
 Director, Students' Welfare
 Associate Director
 Deputy Director

References

Educational institutions established in 1980
Architecture schools in Bangladesh
Technological institutes of Bangladesh
Public engineering universities of Bangladesh
Engineering universities and colleges in Bangladesh
1980 establishments in Bangladesh
Universities and colleges in Gazipur District